Phạm Văn Thành (born 16 March 1994) is a Vietnamese footballer who plays as a forward for V.League 1 club Topeland Bình Định.

Honours

Club
Hà Nội
 V.League 1 winners: 2016, 2018
 runners-up: 2014, 2015
 Vietnamese National Cup runners-up: 2015, 2016
 Vietnamese Super Cup runners-up: 2014, 2016, 2017

References 

1994 births
Living people
Vietnamese footballers
Association football forwards
Hanoi FC players
Ho Chi Minh City FC players
Binh Dinh FC players
V.League 1 players
People from Thái Bình province